Etonia Creek, also known as Etoniah Creek, is a stream in Putnam and Clay counties in Florida. It is the major tributary of Rice Creek, which is a tributary of the St. Johns River. The upper or western part of the stream's basin, the Upper Etonia Creek Basin, contains about 100 lakes. Many of those lakes do not have outflowing streams. On leaving its upper basin, Etonia Creek flows eastward, and then southeastward to its juncture with Rice Creek.

Upper basin 
Small portions of the basin extend into Alachua and Bradford counties.

The underlying structure of the region is limestone with karst features providing underground connections between lakes and with the Floridian aquifer. The lakes in the UECB have formed in solution depressions in the limestone. The highest lakes in the UECB, and the head of the Etonia Creek basin, form a chain. Putnam Prairie drains into Goodson Prairie, from which Etonia Creek arises. Another chain of lakes starts at Melrose Lake, draining through Lake Rowan, Lake Suggs, Twomile Pond, Ross Lake, Goose Lake and Ashley Prairie, joining the Blue Pond chain at Putnam Prairie,

Lower basin 
After leaving the upper basin north of Florahome, Etonia Creek flows eastward and then northeastward through Etoniah State Forest. Northeast of the state forest, Etonia Creek passes eastward through the Etoniah Creek Wildlife Management Area (WMA), where it is joined from the north by Falling Branch, which flows out of George's Lake. While still in the WMA, the creek is next joined from the north by a tributary named Rice Creek (distinct from the Rice Creek that Etonia Creek joins near Palatka).

Notes

References 

Rivers of Florida
North Florida
Bodies of water of Clay County, Florida
Bodies of water of Putnam County, Florida